T-Commerce is a term describing trade via a (smart) digital TV-set which – besides its main functionality – acts as a marketing channel enabling bidirectional communication enabling interactive advertising and addressable advertising. 
It is part of Electronic Business and e-Commerce which themselves are the most prominent parts of u-Commerce. The promise of T-commerce is to enhance shopping channels as well as regular TV ads by offering consumers a "One-Click" "Buy It" possibility.

"Television" or "Tablet"?
An alternative reading of T-Commerce expands the "T" to tablet which would – owing to the fact that tablet computers are predominantly mobile devices -then belong to the realm of mobile commerce. Irrespective of the interpretation of the "T", the extra value of the marketing channel lies in the direct interactivity the devices offer.

Examples
Interactive television with pre-built-in T-commerce app that allows buying online through the television remote control was introduced by Samsung in 2012/13.
H&M was one of the first companies to air a commercial with t-commerce enabled during the Super Bowl in 2014.

See also
Online shopping

References

E-commerce